With less than 150 miles separating the two capital cities of Washington, D.C., and Richmond, Virginia, Northern Virginia found itself in the center of much of the conflict of the American Civil War. The area was the site of many battles and bloodshed. The Army of Northern Virginia was the primary army for the Confederate States of America in the east. Owing to the regions proximity to Washington D.C and the Potomac River, the armies of both sides frequently occupied and traversed Northern Virginia. As a result, several battles were fought in the area:

Clarke County:
Battle of Cool Spring
Battle of Berryville

Fairfax County:
Battle of Chantilly
Battle of Dranesville
Battle of Ox Hill

Fauquier County:
Battle of Thoroughfare Gap

Frederick County:
Battle of Kernstown I
First Battle of Winchester
Second Battle of Winchester
Battle of Kernstown II
Battle of Rutherford's Farm
Third Battle of Winchester
Battle of Belle Grove

Loudoun County:
Battle of Ball's Bluff
Battle of Harpers Ferry
Battle of Aldie
Battle of Middleburg
Battle of Upperville
The Fight at Waterford
Battle of Mile Hill
Battle of Unison
Fight at Aldie
Skirmish at Miskel Farm
Action at Mount Zion Church
Battle of Loudoun Heights
Heaton's Crossroads

Prince William County:
First Battle of Manassas
Second Battle of Manassas
Battle of Manassas Station Ops.

Stafford County:
Battle of Aquia Creek

Warren County:
Battle of Front Royal

See also

.
.